So This Is Paris may refer to:

 So This Is Paris (1955 film), a Technicolor romantic musical comedy film
 So This Is Paris (1926 film), an American silent comedy film